Igor Alekseyevich Vinichenko (born 21 April 1984) is a male hammer thrower from Russia. His personal best throw is 80.00 metres, achieved in February 2007 in Adler. He competed at the 2008 Olympic Games without reaching the final.

Doping 
Vinichenko tested positive for Dehydrochloromethyltestosterone (Oral Turinabol) on 27 February 2013 and was subsequently banned for two years, ending 12 March 2015.

International competitions

See also
List of doping cases in athletics

References

1984 births
Living people
Russian male hammer throwers
Olympic male hammer throwers
Olympic athletes of Russia
Athletes (track and field) at the 2008 Summer Olympics
Universiade medalists in athletics (track and field)
Universiade bronze medalists for Russia
Competitors at the 2011 Summer Universiade
Medalists at the 2007 Summer Universiade
World Athletics Championships athletes for Russia
Russian Athletics Championships winners
Russian sportspeople in doping cases
Doping cases in athletics